The 1951 Copa del Generalísimo Juvenil was the first staging of the tournament. The competition began on 29 April 1951, and ended on 27 May 1951, with the final.

First round

|}

Second round

|}

Second Round Replay

|}

Quarterfinals

|}

Semifinals

|}

Semifinals Replay

|}

Sueca qualified after drawing lot.

Final

|}

Copa del Rey Juvenil de Fútbol
Juvenil